Tirard is a surname. Notable people with the surname include:
 Ann Tirard (1917–2003), English actress
 Corentin Tirard (born 1995), French professional footballer
 Laurent Tirard, (born 1967), French film director and screenwriter
 Paul Tirard (1879–1945), French diplomat
 Pierre Tirard (1827–1893), French politician
 René Tirard (1899–1977), French sprinter